Dimitrios Gontikas or Gondikas (1888–1967) was a Greek politician and Speaker of the Hellenic Parliament.

Biography
Gontikas was born in the village of Magouliana in Arcadia. After studying law at the University of Athens, he spent many years as a lawyer in Pyrgos until 1936, when he was as MP for Elis Prefecture with the Liberal Party ticket. He was re-elected to Parliament with the Liberal Party in the elections of 1946, 1950, 1951 and 1958,  with the Liberal Democratic Union 1956 and with the National Radical Union in 1961.

He occupied various ministerial in several cabinets. He was Supply Minister under Themistoklis Sophoulis (18 November 1948 – 20 January 1949) and Sophoklis Venizelos (23 March – 15 April 1950), and briefly (15–19 April 1950) Minister without Portfolio in the Nikolaos Plastiras cabinet. In 1950–52, he also served as Speaker of the Hellenic Parliament. Gontikas was also chairman of the Greek–American Institute of Athens and of the Greek–Yugoslav Union.

Dimitrios Gontikas was married and had two sons: Kostis, a member of parliament, and Ilias.

References

The first version of the article is translated and is based from the equivalent article at the Greek Wikipedia (el:Main Page)

1888 births
1967 deaths
People from Vytina
Liberal Party (Greece) politicians
Liberal Democratic Union (Greece) politicians
National Radical Union politicians
Government ministers of Greece
Speakers of the Hellenic Parliament
Greek MPs 1936
Greek MPs 1946–1950
Greek MPs 1950–1951
Greek MPs 1951–1952
Greek MPs 1956–1958
Greek MPs 1958–1961
Greek MPs 1961–1963
People of the Greek Civil War